TASI can mean:
 Technical Advisory Service for Images
 Time-assignment speech interpolation
 The Theoretical Advanced Study Institute in elementary particle physics (TASI) at the University of Colorado at Boulder, best known for the TASI lectures in astrophysics and high energy physics
 The Tadawul All Share Index of the Saudi Stock Exchange
 The Animation Society of India